Bishopville may refer to a location in the United States:

Bishopville, Maryland, an unincorporated place
Bishopville, South Carolina, a town
The Bishopville meteorite of 1843 (see Meteorite falls)